Travis Ryan may refer to:

Travis Ryan (musician) (born 1983), Christian songwriter and singer
Travis Ryan, lead vocalist of deathgrind band Cattle Decapitation

See also
Ryan Travis (born 1989), American football fullback